FPS (full name: Forssan Palloseura) is a Finnish ice hockey team based in Forssa Ice Hall (capacity 3000), Forssa, established in 1931. Forssan Palloseura has two lower level teams: FoPS which plays in lower divisions and FoPS Flames which plays in the 2. Divisioona league.

FoPS Flames gained some negative news after former SM-liiga and Forssan Palloseura defenceman Timo Willman assaulted an opposing player during a 3rd Division game in 2007.

Most famous FPS figures are former NHL-coach Alpo Suhonen and player Mika Helkearo who are nicknamed the "Divarin Gretzky" (Gretzky of the 1st Division) from his virtually unbreakable Mestis records in games, assists and points.

Former Liiga teams
Forssa